Stanley Patch is a shoal lying in Port Foster, 2 nautical miles (3.7 km) west-northwest of Fildes Point, Deception Island, in the South Shetland Islands. Named after Stanley, Falkland Islands, by Lieutenant Commander D.N. Penfold, Royal Navy, following his survey in 1948–49.

References

Barrier islands of Antarctica
Geography of Deception Island